The Somalia national under-17 football team (Arabic: الاتحاد الصومالي لكرة القدم), nicknamed the Ocean Stars, represents Somalia at the age of U-17 levels in international football and is controlled by the Somali Football Federation (SFF), a member of the Confederation of African Football (CAF).

Team image

Nicknames

Home stadium
The team play its home matches on the Horseed Stadium and others stadiums.

History
The Somalia national under-17 football team have played their debut game on 2 March 1998 against  Angola at Lubanga, Angola which lost by  0–1 goal. The team in 2022 have won 2022 CECAFA U-17 Championship for the first time and they have qualified to the 2023 Africa Cup of Nations in Algeria. The nation yet to qualified in the FIFA U-17 World Cup.

Current squad
The following squad were named for the recently finished 2022 CECAFA U-17 Championship.

Fixtures and results
Legend

2022

Competition records

FIFA U-17 World Cup

Africa U-17 Cup of Nations

CECAFA U-17 Championship

References

Somalia national football team